Rhode Island is divided into 2 congressional districts, each represented by a member of the United States House of Representatives. It is the second least populous state in the nation to have more than one congressional district. 

The districts are currently represented in the 118th United States Congress by 2 Democrats.

Current districts and representatives

Historical and present district boundaries
Table of United States congressional district boundary maps in the State of Rhode Island, presented chronologically. All redistricting events that took place in Rhode Island between 1973 and 2013 are shown. District numbers are represented by the map fill colors.

Obsolete districts
Rhode Island's at-large congressional district
Rhode Island's 3rd congressional district

References

See also
United States congressional delegations from Rhode Island